Tan-y-Manod railway station  was a railway station approximately  south of , in Gwynedd (formerly Merionethshire), North Wales.

History

Narrow gauge days
The station was on the  narrow gauge Festiniog and Blaenau Railway (F&BR); it opened with the line on 30 May 1868. The F&BR ran the three and a half route miles from its southern terminus at Llan Ffestiniog to a junction with the Ffestiniog Railway (FR) at Dolgarregddu Junction near what is nowadays Blaenau Ffestiniog station.

The station site served three purposes:

 a passenger station, whose main but not sole traffic was quarrymen travelling to and from work
 a passing loop, and
 a place where inclines from slate quarries met the F&BR

In common with all other F&BR stations there were no platforms, carriages were very low to the ground, so passengers boarded from and alighted to the trackside. The station had a single-storey building on the eastern, outer, side of the sharply curving track. No details of its facilities have been published. In common with Festiniog and Tyddyngwyn stations, the only published photographs were taken from a distance, lending the buildings the appearance of corrugated iron. The sole close-up photo is of the line's northern terminus - . This shows the building to bear a striking resemblance to 21st Century PVC weatherboarding. If the line's other stations were made of the same material that would explain their corrugated mien.

In F&BR days the gauges of the quarries, the F&BR and the Ffestiniog Railway were sufficiently close to allow trucks to pass between the three, with the F&BR being near enough to FR standards to enable FR locos and wagons to use F&BR metals to reach Tan-y-Manod if needed, which they were until F&BR locos arrived some time after the line opened, and occasionally thereafter.

Services
The February 1878 narrow gauge timetable shows that all trains called at all stations on the line, with
 Northbound ("Up")
 four public trains running Monday to Saturday
 an unadvertised morning workmen's train running Monday to Saturday
 two public evening trains on Saturdays only
 The journey time from Tan-y-Manod to Diphwys(F&BR) was 7 minutes.
 Southbound ("Down")
 four public trains running Monday to Saturday
 a morning workmen's train running Monday to Saturday
 two public evening trains on Saturdays only
 a teatime workmen's train on Saturdays only
 The journey time from Diphwys (F&BR) to Tan-y-Manod was 3 minutes.
 There was no Sunday service.

Duffws was the F&BR's Blaenau station and would become the site of the town's later GWR station, but it was not the Festiniog Railway's  station. Through passengers from Tan-y-Manod to  would alight at the F&BR's Diphwys station and walk across Church Street in Blaenau to the Festiniog Railway's completely separate Duffws station. Most trains were timetabled to make this process workable, if tight. Whether connecting trains were held in the case of late running is not recorded.

In the line's early days trains many trains ran "mixed", but this was stopped in 1877. Unlike most railways in the area, passengers were the line's mainstay. In 1879 - a typical year - passenger receipts were £1406 compared with £416 for goods. No figures have been published specifically for Tan-y-Manod.

The standard gauge approaches
On 1 September 1882 the standard gauge Bala and Festiniog Railway reached Llan Ffestiniog from the south, enabling a passenger from (say) Bala to Tan-y-Manod to transfer from a standard gauge train to a narrow gauge train by walking a few yards, much as modern-day passengers transfer between Conwy Valley Line and Ffestiniog Railway trains at Blaenau Ffestiniog.

From April the following year the narrow gauge line was converted to standard gauge. Narrow gauge trains continued to operate during the conversion, using a third rail and a diversion around the wooden viaduct north of Tan-y-Manod, which was demolished and replaced by a stone version. Narrow gauge trains ceased running on 5 September 1883 with standard gauge services beginning on 10 September 1883.

Standard gauge days
The site was quite restricted, being on a curved embankment bounded by hillsides. The Bala and Festiniog Railway, then later the Great Western developed Tan-y-Manod's facilities and priorities, they

 removed the passing loop
 demolished the passenger station building, and
 never provided passenger services

in their place they installed:

 a single "road" (track) engine shed with a water crane
 a  turntable
 a siding, and
 two slate transshipment sidings.

Each transshipment siding (sometimes referred to as a transfer dock or a wharf or a loading bank) had either one or a pair of narrow gauge lines raised on a platform meeting a standard gauge line end-to-end. The standard gauge transporter wagons (sometimes called "host" wagons) were flat wagons with narrow gauge tracks set on top. The heights of the tracks meant that six slate wagons could be manhandled 'pick-a-back' onto each transporter wagon in pairs, side by side. They were made up to trains then hauled to Blaenau Ffestiniog where either the above process was reversed with the narrow gauge wagons being manually propelled onto the narrow gauge Ffestiniog Railway or they were unloaded, sorted and transshipped into GWR standard gauge wagons. When the latter happened they ended up travelling southwards past Tan-y-Manod on the way to their final destination. The layout of at least the most northerly of the raised sidings lent itself to unloading slates conventionally, side by side from narrow gauge wagons to standard gauge, but use in this way is not described in sources.

The GWR, like the LNWR and the FR, provided the quarry owners with free use of narrow gauge wagons in an attempt to promote the use of their own route. A batch of 50 were ordered from Swindon in 1899, a survivor was on public display at Llechwedd Slate Caverns in 1977. Slate traffic using the transporter wagons continued until Craig Ddu quarry closed in 1945, after which the transfer sidings lay disused.

The engine shed - a sub-shed of Croes Newydd - closed as long ago as 1906, but it was clearly in use for some purpose in 1936. The building was demolished between 1936 and 1959 except for the walls towards the rear which supported the water tank which served the water crane, with the buffer stops being moved forwards outside the site of the shed. Walls, tank, crane and turntable remained in use to the last train on 27 January 1961. It was custom and practice for all locomotives which arrived at Blaenau to be sent to Tan-y-Manod to be watered, serviced and turned. They then returned to Blaenau for their next train southwards, sometimes shunting coal wagons at Blaenau gas works on the way.

1961 Railway Reopening
The line closed in 1961 but it was mothballed pending building the long-discussed cross-town link to enable trains to run along the Conwy Valley Line, through Blaenau and on to Trawsfynydd nuclear power station which was then being built. The line past the site of Tan-y-Manod station, the engine shed and transshipment sidings reopened on 24 April 1964, but none of Tan-y-Manod's facilities were brought back to life. The line closed again in 1998 as the nuclear plant was being decommissioned. Once more the route was mothballed in case a future use is found.

The station site in the 21st Century
By 2011 the whole site had been completely demolished. In Spring 2016 the mothballed single track line still ran past the site to the former nuclear flask loading point.

The future
Between 2000 and 2011 there were at least two attempts to put the remaining line to use. In 2011 there were proposals to use the rails as a recreational velorail track. Neither this nor the earlier idea came to anything. The possibility remains that the surviving line could see future preservation or reuse by the nuclear industry.

To considerable local surprise fresh moves to reopen the line from Blaenau as far south as Trawsfynydd began in September 2016, with the formation of 
The Trawsfynydd & Blaenau Ffestiniog Community Railway Company. On 21 September at least one regional newspaper reported that "Volunteers are set to start work this weekend on clearing vegetation from the trackbed between Blaenau Ffestiniog and Trawsfynydd." The company was quoted as saying "We have been given a licence by Network Rail to clear and survey the line."

Gallery

References

Sources

Further material

External links

 The station site on a navigable OS Map National Library of Scotland
 The site on a navigable 1953 OS map npe Maps
 The station and line Rail Map Online
 The line LJT2 with mileages Railway Codes
 Reminiscences by a local railwayman Forgotten Relics
 Driver's view through the station to Blaenau YouTube
 Several photos of the line Penmorfa
 Several photos of the line Penmorfa
 The line in 2009 The Railway Muddler
 A special along the line 2D53
 Details of Summer 1989 excursions through the station Six Bells Junction
 Details and photos of 22 Jan 1961 railtour Six Bells Junction
 Photos of 22 Jan 1961 railtour Robert Darlaston
 The 22 Jan 1961 last train special YouTube
 An inspection saloon ride on the line, Part 1 YouTube
 An inspection saloon ride on the line, Part 2 YouTube

Disused railway stations in Gwynedd
Ffestiniog
Railway stations in Great Britain opened in 1868
Railway stations in Great Britain closed in 1883